Filippo is an Italian male given name, which is the equivalent of the English name Philip, from the Greek Philippos, meaning "amante dei cavalli".  The female variant is Filippa. The name may refer to:

Filippo I Colonna (1611–1639), Italian nobleman
Filippo II Colonna (1663–1714), Italian noblemen
Filippo Abbiati (1640–1715), Italian painter
Filippo Baldinucci (1624–1697), Italian historian
Filippo Brunelleschi (1377–1446), Italian architect
Filippo Carli (1876–1938), Italian sociologist
Filippo Castagna (1765–1830), Maltese politician
Filippo Coarelli (born 1936), Italian archaeologist
Filippo Coletti (1811–1894), Italian singer
Filippo di Piero Strozzi (1541–1582), French general
Filippo Salvatore Gilii (1721–1789), Italian priest and linguist
Filippo Grandi (born 1957), Italian diplomat
Filippo Illuminato (1930-1943), Italian partisan, recipient of the Gold Medal of Military Valour
Filippo Inzaghi (born 1973), Italian football player and manager
Filippo Lippi (1406–1469), Italian painter
Filippo Lombardi (footballer) (born 1990), Italian footballer
Filippo Lombardi (politician) (born 1956), Swiss politician
Filippo Lussana (1820–1897), Italian doctor
Filippo Magnini (born 1982), Italian swimmer
Filippo Mannucci (born 1974), Italian rower
Filippo Marinetti (1876–1944), Italian writer
Filippo Nigro (born 1970), Italian actor
Filippo Parlatore (1816–1877), Italian botanist
Filippo Raguzzini (1690–1771), Italian architect 
Filippo Rusuti (1255–1325), Italian painter
Filippo Scelzo (1900–1980), Italian actor
Filippo Severoli (1762–1822), Italian general
Filippo Timi (born 1974), Italian actor 
Filippo Turati (1857–1932), Italian politician

See also
 Pippo (disambiguation)
 Filippino (given name), the dimunitive form

References

Italian masculine given names